Stephen Jordan (26 December 1886 – 15 September 1975) was an Irish Fianna Fáil politician. He was first elected to Dáil Éireann as a Fianna Fáil Teachta Dála (TD) for the Galway constituency at the September 1927 general election. He was re-elected at the 1932 and 1933 general elections but lost his seat at the 1937 general election. 

A sports administrator, he refereed the first All-Ireland camogie final in 1932.

References

1886 births
1975 deaths
Fianna Fáil TDs
Members of the 6th Dáil
Members of the 7th Dáil
Members of the 8th Dáil
Politicians from County Galway
Camogie referees